Aninoasa ( or Aninószabányatelep) is a town in Hunedoara County in the Transylvania region of Romania.  The town is located in Jiu Valley, which is a coal basin, and many of the towns residents are coal miners.  Most of the town was built along Aninoasa creek, and the town is actually separated into two areas by the West Jiu River. "Anin" means "alder tree" in Romanian.

Aninoasa is the oldest town in Hunedoara County, being mentioned as far back as 1453 AD. It administers one village, Iscroni (Alsóbarbatyeniszkrony). At the 2011 census, 88.18% of inhabitants were Romanians, 7.1% Roma and 4.18% Hungarians. It officially became a town in 1989, as a result of the Romanian rural systematization program.

See also
 Jiu Valley

References

External links

 Official site
 Aninoasa City Site - Jiu Valley Portal - regional portal host of the official site
Jiu Valley Portal - Romania's principal coal mining region and a gateway to the Retezat National Park

Towns in Romania
Populated places in Hunedoara County
Localities in Transylvania
Jiu Valley
Mining communities in Romania
Monotowns in Romania